Buster Brown was an early 20th-century U.S. comic strip character.

Buster Brown may also refer to:

People
 Buster Brown (baseball) (1881–1914), American baseball pitcher
 Buster Brown (footballer) (1910–1993), English footballer 
 Buster Brown (musician) (1911–1976), American blues musician
 Buster Brown (Texas politician), member of Texas Senate, District 21, 1945–1949
 J. E. "Buster" Brown (born 1940), Texas state senator, 1981–2002
 James Sutherland Brown (1881–1951), Canadian Military Officer
 Oliver Brown (footballer) (1908–1953), also known as Buster Brown, English footballer 
 R. M. Brown (1885–1927), American football coach
 Ulysses Brown (1920–1942), American baseball catcher in the Negro leagues
 Buster Brown (Canadian football) (born c. 1930), Canadian football player

Other
 Buster Brown & Company, shoe company that sells Buster Brown shoes
 Buster Brown (Australian band) (1973–1976), Australian rock music group
 Buster Brown (band), a glam metal band from Louisville, Kentucky

Brown, Buster